Drymaeus sulphureus is a species of  tropical air-breathing land snail, a pulmonate gastropod mollusk in the family Bulimulidae. It is found in tropical America.

Drymaeus
Gastropods described in 1856